"Dance, Dance (The Mexican)" was the fourth and final single from Thalía's 2002 self-titled studio album; it is a remake of a 1984 song by Jellybean.  The Hex Hector remix was played by several radio stations in 2002 and reached the #6 position on Billboard's "Dance/Club Play Songs."

Song information
This song was written by Thalía, Cory Rooney, JC Oliver and S. Barnes, and produced by Poke y Tone and Cory Rooney. Also, it contains an excerpt of "Mexican", written by Alan Shacklock.

Spanish version features Marc Anthony's vocals in the chorus - Both Thalía and Marc Anthony were recording their new albums with Cory Rooney at the same time, and one day Rooney showed Marc Anthony a song that he was producing for Thalía ("The Mexican 2002"). Then he thought it was amazing and asked Rooney for a collaboration in the chorus in order to surprise Thalía.

The Hex Hector Club remix of the song received airplay in 2002. An extended version of this remix (clocking in at 8:48 & is performed in English) appears on Thalia's self titled 2003 album.

Promotion
In December 2003, Thalía was invited to the Jingle Ball along with other artists such as Jennifer Lopez, Britney Spears, Kelly Clarkson, Beyonce, Sean Paul, and Simple Plan and where she was the first of nine artists to sing where she performed the song along with her hits Baby, I'm in Love, I Want You, and ¿A Quién le Importa?.

Track listing
U.S. 12" vinyl single (2002)
"Dance Dance (The Mexican)" [Hex Hector/Mac Quayle Club Vocal Up Mix]
"Dance Dance (The Mexican)" [Ricky Crespo Dance Radio Edit]
"Dance Dance (The Mexican)" [Hex Hector/Mac Quayle Dub Mix]
"Dance Dance (The Mexican)" [Alterboy Remix]

Official Remixes/Versions
"Dance Dance (The Mexican)" [Hex Hector/Mac Quayle Club Vocal Up Mix]
"Dance Dance (The Mexican)" [Hex Hector/Mac Quayle Dub Mix]
"Dance Dance (The Mexican)" [Hex Hector/Mac Quayle Radio Remix]
"Dance Dance (The Mexican)" [Ricky Crespo Dance Radio Edit]
"Dance Dance (The Mexican)" [Alterboy Remix]
"Dance Dance (The Mexican)" [Fluid Dark Side Mix] 
"Dance Dance (The Mexican)" [Spanish - featuring Marc Anthony]
"Dance Dance (The Mexican)" [Hex Hector/Mac Quayle Radio Remix] [Spanish - featuring Marc Anthony]

Charts

References

2003 singles
Thalía songs
Marc Anthony songs
Songs written by Cory Rooney
EMI Latin singles
Songs written by Thalía
Songs written by Jean-Claude Olivier
Songs written by Samuel Barnes (songwriter)
Song recordings produced by Cory Rooney
2003 songs
Song recordings produced by Trackmasters
English-language Mexican songs